Tchphnx (pronounced Touchphonics) is most known for his production work within the drum and bass, breakbeat, and hip hop genres. He is also an active DJ and turntablist. He resides in San Francisco, California. He co-founded the record label Elevated Press Records in 2009. The label currently releases his own material along with various other artists. Starting in 2013, Tchphnx began releasing material under the new stripped back spelling to avoid trademark infringement.

Discography

Albums 
 New Beginnings (2013)

Singles and EPs
 "OG Roots" (2013)
 "A Million Pieces" feat. Alex Lee (2012)

References

External links 
 Discography on Discogs
 Elevated Press Records
 Official SoundCloud Page
 XLR8R feature
 Hip Hop DX feature
 I Make Records video

American DJs
Living people
American drum and bass musicians
American hip hop record producers
Electronic dance music DJs
Year of birth missing (living people)